This is a list of the Australia 2020 Summit participants, and their working groups, announced on 28 March 2008.

Australia 2020 Summit Delegates (General) 
Chair: Professor Glyn Davis

A long-term national health strategy 
Chair: Professor Michael F. Good

Professor Diane Geraldine Alcorn
Ms Pat Anderson
Mr Warwick Anderson
Professor Kaarin Anstey
Mrs Julianne Badenoch
Professor Perry F Bartlett
Professor Louise Alison Baur
Professor Peter Brooks
Mr Graham Charles Brown
Professor Graham Brown
Dr Ngiare J Brown
Associate Professor Brendan Burkett
Ms Belinda Caldwell
Dr Ian Cameron
Ms Alisa Camplin
Professor Jonathan Rhys Carapetis
Ms Kate Carnell
Professor Elizabeth Mary Chiarella
Associate Professor David Colquhoun
Ms Janelle Colquhoun
Professor Suzanne Cory
Dr Catherine Crock
Mr David Crosbie
Professor Tony Cunningham
Professor Jon Nicolas Currie
Professor John Daly
Mr Robert de Castella
Professor Caroline May de Costa
Ms Hanan Dover
Ms Elizabeth Elliot
Professor Niki Ellis
Professor Christian Ansgar Otto Gericke
Mr Michael Gooda
Professor Michelle Haber
Dr Clive David Hadfield
Dr Mukesh Chandra Haikerwal
Professor Margaret Hamilton AO
Professor Ian Bernard Hickie AM
Mr James Hird
Ms Helen Hopkins
Dr Anna Howe
Ms Gerardine (Ged) Kearney
Professor Helen Marie Keleher
Professor Anne Kelso
Professor Hal Kendig
Professor Michael Richard Kidd
Ms Sabina Margaret Knight
Mr Jonathon Kruger
Professor Stephen Ross Leeder
Mr Michael Luscombe
Professor Tony McMichael
Dr Caroline McMillen
Dr Brian McNamee
Professor John Anthony Mendoza
Professor Rob Moodie
Dr Beverly Sara Muhlhausler
Associate Professor Christopher Newell AM
Professor Brian Frederick Oldenburg
Dr Susan Oliver
Ms Lynne Pezzullo
Mr Frederick Allan Pidgeon
Professor Lawrie Powell
Dr Vasantha Preetham
Dr Deborah Rathjen
Mr Michael Rayner
Dr Leanna Read
Professor Sally Redman
Dr Ian Reinecke
Dr Mike Rungie
Associate Professor Elizabeth Savage
Ms Anne-Marie Scully
Professor Cindy Shannon
Dr Sunita Shaunak
Professor Margaret Sheil
Dr Meredith Sheil
Dr Clare Alice Skinner
Professor Andrew (John) Spencer
Dr Rosemary Allison Stanton
Ms Janelle Stirling
Dr Marian Sullivan
Associate Professor Paul Torzillo
Ms Anne Trimmer
Dr Jim Varghese
Dr Alison Venn
Professor Emma Whitelaw
Associate Professor Ted Wilkes
Mr Peter Wills AC
Professor Gary Allen Wittert
Dr Fiona Wood
Dr Catherine Elizabeth Yelland

Australia's future security and prosperity in a rapidly changing region and world 
Chair: Professor Michael Wesley

Mr Waleed Aly
Professor Kent Anderson
Ms Kate Barelle
Dr Walter Samuel Grono Bateman
Ms Tamerlaine Beasley
Dr Sarah Bekessy
Mr Christian David Bennett
Associate Professor Santina Bertone
Mr Bill Bowtell
Ms Denise Boyd
Dr Susan Jennifer Delyse Boyd
Ms Susan Margaret Brennan
Ms Sharan Burrow
Mr Damian Burton
MS Danielle Louise Chubb
Ms Melissa Conley Tyler
Mr Gregory Rolph Copley
General Peter Cosgrove AC MC (ret)
Mr Paddy Crumlin
Dr Jane Patricia Cunneen
Dr James Barton Curran
Ms Aguil De Chut Deng
Ms Geraldine Doogue
Professor Alan Dupont
Ms Katherine Fallah
Dr Simon David Feeny
Ms Dimity Fifer
Ms Julia Anne Fraser
Mr John Gibson
Ms Sara Louise Goldsworthy
Dr Jane Elizabeth Golley
Mr Abraham Steven Gubler
Mr Alan Gyngell
Dr Bronwyn Delveen Harch
Professor David Hill
Ms Felicity Jane Hill
Dr Anna Hutchens
Ms Elena Jeffreys
Professor Alison Jones
Dr Chris Theng Hong Kang
Ms Antonia Krystina Kaucz
Ms Phoebe Cecile Knowles
Ms Martine Letts
Mr Jason Yat-Sen Li
Ms Serena Lilywhite
Professor Tim Lindsey
Mr Alastair Fraser MacGibbon
Professor Andrew MacIntyre
Ms Eliza Matthews
Professor Lorraine Mazzerolle
Associate Professor Jude McCulloch
Mr Ben McDevitt
Ms Jennifer Margaret McGregor
Mr Huw McKay
Mr Alexander Callum McLeod
Ms Fiona Margaret McLeod SC
Ms Louise Michelle Merrington
Ms Louisa Jane Minney
Ms Caroline Emma Morrison
Dr Katherine Morton
Mr Warren Mundine
Ms Maha Najjarine
Mr Gregory Williams Nelson
Chief Commissioner Christine Nixon
Mr Andrew O'Neil
Dr Dave Peebles
Associate Professor Sharon Pickering
Dr George Quinn
Mr Paul Andrew Godwin Ramadge
Ms Mahboba Rawi
Mr Garry Llewellyn Redlich
Professor Benjamin Reilly
Mr John Francis Richardson
Mr Neville Joseph Roach
Mr Michael Roux
Professor Amin Saikal
Ms Leigh Peta Sales
Dr Ben Saul
Mr Phil Scanlan
Mr Gregory Sheridan
Mrs Jillian Sylvia Shoebridge
Dr Gary Gordon Sigley
Ms Robyn Slarke
Ms Deborah Rosalyn Storie
Professor Swee-Hin Toh
Ms Nola Watson
Associate Professor David Peter Wright-Neville
Associate Professor Samina Yasmeen
Mr Kevin Wei-Cher Yeoh

Future directions for the Australian economy 
Chair: Dr David Morgan

Dr Bronte Adams
Professor Patricia Apps
Mr Don Argus
Ms Nicola Ballenden
Mr Gary Banks
Ms Juliet Bourke
Ms Cath Bowtell
Mr Steve Bracks
Mr Stephen Bradford
Mr Mark Douglas Irving Burrows
Ms Margot Cairnes
Ms Sally Anne Capp
Mr Bob Carr
Mr Michael Chaney
Ms Melinda Cilento
Ms Megan Clark
Dr Marilyn Clare Clark-Murphy
Mr Paul Clitheroe
Mr Tony Cole
Professor Edwina Cornish
Ms Katie Dean
Mr Geoff Dixon
Ms Elena Joy Douglas
Professor Steve Dowrick
Ms Eileen Doyle
Ms Jane Elizabeth Drake-Brockman
Mr Bill Evans
Mr Ted Evans
Dr Lucy Ashley Firth
Ms Joan Fitzpatrick
Mr Brian Flannery
Mr John Ellis Flint
Mr Andrew Forrest
Professor John Foster
Ms Tania Foster
Mr Lindsay Fox
Mr Greg Gailey
Mr Nick Greiner
Dr Susan Betty Harwood
Ms Elaine Henry
Mr Russell Higgins
Professor Frederick George Hilmer AO
Mr Lance Hockridge
Professor Margaret Anne Jackson
Ms Margaret Jackson AC
Ms Amanda Jane Johnston
Professor Pramod Nagorao Junankar
Dr Michael Keating
Ms Narelle Anne Kennedy
Mr David Kirk
Mr Marius Kloppers
Mr Greg Lindsay
Professor Max Gaoqing Lu
Professor Sonja Lyneham
Ms Kerrie Mather
Mr Donald McGauchie
Mr Patrick McKendry
Mr Greg Medcraft
Dr James Bradfield Moody
Lord Mayor Clover Moore
Mr Alan Moss
Mr John Mulcahy
Ms Jude Munro
Mr Lachlan Murdoch
Mr Ralph Norris
Ms Helen Nugent
Emeritus Professor Mary Josephine O'Kane
Mr James Packer
Mr Tony (Anthony) Bennett Park
Ms Narelle Lisa Pearse
Mr John Porter
Mrs Heather May Ridout
Mr John Cameron Robertson
Ms Ann Caroline Sherry AO
Mr Tim Simms
Mr Glenn Stevens
Mr John Stewart
Ms Louise Tarrant
Ms Helene Teichmann
Mr Steve Vamos
Mr Garry Weaven
Mr Sam White
Ms Alice Williams
Ms Deidre Willmott
Mr Peter Yates

Future directions for rural industries and rural communities 
Chair: Mr Tim Fischer

Ms Sue Ann Adair
Ms Susie Allison
Professor Margaret Alston
Ms Kate Andrews
Mr David Ansell
Mr Peter Bailey
Mrs Deborah Bain
Mrs Maxine Margaret Baldwin
Ms Genevieve Mary Barlow
Mr Dean Belle
Mr Donald Ian Blesing
Mr Kenneth Arnold Boundy
Ms Robyn Claire Boundy
Ms Merrill Joan Boyd
Mrs Susan G Bradley J P
Mr Drew Braithwaite
Mrs Bobby Brazil
Ms Lucy Broad
Mrs Helen Marguerite Reading Cathles
Ms Anne Champness
Mr Roy Chisholm
Mr Joel Michael Clark
Mr Everald Ernest Compton
Mrs Lucinda Lee Flinders Corrigan
Mrs Lynette Coulston
Mr David Charles Crombie
Mr Monte Dwyer
Associate Professor Anthony English
Mr George Etrelezis
Mr John Fisher OAM
Dr James Paul Fitzpatrick
Mr Roger Fletcher
Ms Susan Natalie Frater
Ms Jodie May Goldsworthy
Mr John Laurence Gosper
Mr Robert Geoffrey Granger
Mr Frederick Sheppard Grimwade
Professor Fiona M. Haslam McKenzie
Mr Ben Scott Haslett
Mr Brett Heading
Mr Stuart James Higgins
Ms Serenity Hill
Mr James Graham Houston
Mr Paul Howes
Mr Robert Beresford Hudson
Dr Bill Hurditch
Ms Alana Johnson
Mr Gary Richard Johnston
Ms Kerrina Victoria King
Dr John William Kramer
Dr Susan Jennifer Lambert
Mr Paul Lane
Professor Deidre Lemerle
Professor Bob Lonne
Ms Kate Maree Lord
Mr Alexander Ian Macintosh AM
Mr Simon Mansfield
Dr Suzanne Elizabeth Martin
Dr Mark Francis McGovern
Ms Catherine McGowan
Mr John Martin McQuilten
Mrs Karen Diane Morrissey
Ms Marion Murphy
Mr Sidney Hordern Myer
Mrs Mary Elizabeth Nenke
Mr Bryan Geoffrey John Nye
Dr Julianne Maree O'Reilly-Wapstra
Mr Scott Pape
Ms Elaine Janet Paton
Ms Claire Anne Penniceard
Mr Charles Jeffreys Prell
Ms Vanessa Rankin
Mr Peter Reading
Professor Timothy Gerald Reeves
Mr Steven Victor Richardson
Ms Linda Sewell
Ms Frances Marie Shapter
Mrs Georgina Jane Persse Somerset
Mrs Jacqueline Stutt
Mrs Michelle Leanne Thiele
Ms Terry Underwood
Ms Diane Walsh
Mrs Mary Ann Walsh
Mrs Beth Louise Welden
Mr Richard (Dick) Wells
Councillor Robert Ian Wilson
Mrs Heather Adelle Wilton
Dr Susan Wong
Ms Rosemary Young, AM

Future of Australian governance 
Chair: John Hartigan

Ms Erin Adams
Mr Phillip Adams
Mr Peter Ajak
Mr Martin James Bailey
Ms Robin Banks
Mr Sean Barrett
Mr Benedict Bartl
Senator the Hon George Brandis
Professor Judith Margaret Brett
Dr Alexander Jonathon Brown
Mr Julian William Kennedy Burnside
Associate Professor Lyn Carson
Mr Paul Chadwick
Professor Hilary Charlesworth
Professor Greg Craven
Associate Professor Kate Jane Crawford
Sir William Deane
Ms Miranda Devine
Mr Macgregor Duncan
Mr Harry Evans
Professor Allan Fels
Mr Joseph Martin Fernandez
The Honourable Matthew (Matt) Joseph Foley
Mr Paul Formosa
Ms Pia-Angela Francini
Ms Alison Lesley Gaines
Professor Geoffrey Ian Gallop
The Honourable Justice Mary Gaudron
Ms Kate Gauthier
Ms Janet Giles
Ms Olivia Guarna
Ms Susan Gail Harris Rimmer
Professor Janette Hartz-Karp
Mr Michael James Harvey
Mr Gerard Henderson
Ms Iresha Herath
Ms Kristen Anna Isobel Hilton
Ms Elizabeth Francesca Ho
Ms Janet Eileen Hunt
Dr Helen Irving
Ms Bridie Kathleen Jabour
Professor Sarah Louise Joseph
Ms Joanne Kelly
Dr Paul Kelly
Ms Janice Winearls Keynton
Ms Amy Sarah King
Professor the Honourable Michael Lavarch
Ms Miriam Lyons
Dr Terry MacDonald
Professor Robert Manne
Mr David Marr
Sir Anthony Mason
Ms Lyn Mason
Mr Michael McKinnon
Mr Alexander McLaughlin
Mr Ian McPhee
Mr Stewart Mcrae
Ms Sarah Jane O'Rourke
Ms Holly Elizabeth Ransom
Mr Simon Rice
Ms Jamila Helen Rizvi
Mr Mauri Japarta Ryan
Ms Katherine Dawn Sampson
Professor Cheryl Anne Saunders
Professor Marian Sawer
Mr Wayne Francis Scheggia
Prof Julianne Schultz
The Honourable Helen Sham-Ho
Dr Christine (Chrissy) Sharp
Professor Christopher Dominic Sidoti
Ms Amelia Mary Simpson
Ms Tanya Louise Smith
Mr Brett Solomon
Dr David Solomon
Mr Matt Stevens
Mr Kerry Stokes
Rev Professor Michael Tate
Dr Anne Tiernan
Associate Professor Anne Frances Twomey
Ms Danielle Vujovich
Ms Sally Warhaft
Professor Patrick Weller AO
Mr Howard Whitton
Professor George Williams
Mr Alan Wu
Dr Sally Young

Options for the future of Indigenous Australia 
Chair: Dr Jackie Huggins

Dr Mick Adams
Mr Alfred Parry Agius
Ms Carolyn Allport
Professor Jon Altman
Professor Ian Anderson
Dr Veronica Arbon
Mrs Leah Marie Armstrong
Ms Muriel Bamblett AM
Mr Wayne Bergmann
Mr Mark Bin Bakar
Ms Susan Pamela Boucher
Professor Wendy Brabham
Father Frank Brennan
Mr Paul Anthony Briggs OAM
Professor Peter Buckskin
Ms Alison Carroll
Ms Julie Cobb
Ms Renee Kay Coffey
Ms Adele Helena Cox
Ms Brenda Louise Croft
Ms Megan Jane Davis
Mr Graham Hamilton Dillon
Mr Rodney Scott Dillon
Mr Damien Djerrkura
Mr Patrick Dodson
Ms Marcia Ella Duncan
Ms Anne Murren Dunn
Ms Caroline Edwards
Ms Jeannie Nugeryai Egan
Mrs Christine Fejo-King
Ms Eugene Elizabeth Hooi Lee (Eugenia) Flynn
Mrs Nicola Margaret Forrest
Mr Darryl Gardiner
Ms Janina Gawler
Ms Kate George
Mr Daniel Thomas Gilbert
Ms Mary Graham
Mr Stephen Hagan
Mr Bill Hart
Associate Professor Colleen Patricia Hayward
Dr Richard Hazelwood
Mrs Dot Henry
Mr Gary John Highland
Ms Tanya Louise Hosch
Mrs Matilda House
Professor Edward Shane Houston
Ms Terri Janke
Dr Christine Jeffries-Stokes
Dr Marlene Kong
Mr Steven Raymond Larkin
Associate Professor Teresa Sue Lea
Mr Danny Lester
Ms Barbara Mary Livesey
Dr Sarah Maddison
Professor Ann Margaret McGrath
Mr Jeff McMullen AM
Ms Shirley McPherson
Ms Karen Michelle Milward
Ms Makinti Rosalind Minutjukur
Mr Romlie Mokak
Mr Bill Moss
Mr Vince Mundraby
Ms Yananymul Mununggurr
Professor Nicholas Martin Nakata
Ms Sana Nakata
The Honourable Alastair Nicholson
Ms Bronwyn Nimmo
Dr Rae Norris
Ms Kristie Parker
Mr Bruce Pascoe
Mr Noel Pearson
Mr Andrew Penfold
Ms Hetti Perkins
Mr Shane Phillips
Ms Susan Pinckham
Dr Raymattja Marika
Mr Thomas Jangala Rice
Mr David Ross
Ms Darcel Russell
Professor Fiona Juliet Stanley
Mayor Napau Pedro Stephen
Ms Georgia Symmons
Mr Barry Taylor
Mr Ian Richard Trust
Ms Patricia Ann Turner
Commissioner Klynton Wanganeen
Dr Mark Wenitong
Ms Tammy Williams
Mr Neil Michael Willmett
Mr Wali Wunungmurra
Mr Peter Yu
Mr Tyson Yunkaporta

Population, sustainability, climate change and water 
Chair: Mr Roger Beale

Ms Maria Atkinson
Mr Damien Troy Bell
Mr Michael Peter Berwick
Professor Marcela Bilek
Mr Carl Eric Binning
Dr Stuart Blanch
Dr Grant Blashki
Ms Georgina Elise Boon
Mrs Leith Boully
Mr Greg Bourne
Ms Petrea Bradford
Ms Jillian Broadbent
Ms Larissa Brown
Emeritus Professor Valerie Anne Brown
Mr Russell Ronald Caplan
Ms Irina Cattalini
Ms Erin Mara Cini
Mr Peter Coates
Professor Chris (Christopher Reid) Cocklin
Dr Peter J Cook
Dr Wendy Craik
Professor Mary Elizabeth Crock
Ms Cheryl Desha
Mr Stewart Ellis
Ms Penelope Figgis (AO)
Dr Brian Fisher
Professor Timothy Flannery
Professor Ross Garnaut
Professor Stephen Thomas Garnett
Dr Geoff Garrett
Ms Melissa-Leigh Jane George
Professor Ross Stewart Guest
Ms Tanya Ha
Dr Steve Hatfield Dodds
Mr Michael Hawker
Professor Lesley Margaret Head
Dr Judy Isabel Henderson
Ms Anne Howe
Mr Gerry Hueston
Dr Karen Elizabeth Hussey
Mr Andrew Jaspan
Ms Susan Barbara Jeanes
Dr Andrew Kenneth Leonard Johnson
Honourable Dr Barry Owen Jones
Professor David John Karoly
The Hon Roslyn Joan Kelly
Professor Shahbaz Khan
Mr Ian Bruce Kiernan
Mr Eric Ronald Wing-Fai Knight
Dr Gabrielle Sarah Kuiper
The Hon Susan Mary Lenehan
Professor Ian Lowe
Professor Amanda Lynch
Ms Romilly Madew
Professor Warwick James McKibbin
Ms Robyn Leigh McLeod
Dr Pam McRae-Williams
Mr Stephen Mills
Mr Joe Morrison
Ms Sam Mostyn
Dr Chloe Munro
Ms Elizabeth Ann Nosworthy
Adjunct Professor Monica Viviene Oliphant
Ms Natasha Palich
Mr George Pappas
Dr Graeme Ivan Pearman
Mrs Joanne Louise Pfeiffer
Professor Hugh Possingham
Ms Elaine Prior
Professor John Quiggin
Mr Marcus Randolph
Dr Russell Evan Reichelt
Ms Tania Ritchie
Dr Bev Ronalds
Ms Anna Rose
Mr Joe Ross
Mr Bernard Joseph Salt
Ms Ann Kathryn Shaw Rungie
Mr David Shelmerdine
Dr Paul Simshauser
Professor Will Steffen
Dr Lorraine Stephenson
The Honourable John Thwaites
Professor Patrick Nicol Troy, AO
Dr Tony Paul Wilkins

Strengthening communities, supporting families and social inclusion 
Chair: Mr Tim Costello

Dr Mohamad Abdalla
Ms Hala Abdelnour
Mr Fadi Abdul-Rahman
Ms Maayan Adler
Ms Vivienne Amery
Ms Gina Nancy McGregor Anderson
Mrs Shelley Argent
Dr Mark Bagshaw
Ms Toni May Bauman
Ms Elleni Bereded-Samuel
Ms Jennifer Branch
Professor Freda Briggs
Ms Elizabeth Broderick
Monsignor David Cappo
Ms Elizabeth Cham
Associate Professor Chris Chamberlain
Mrs Katrina Clark
Ms Margherita Coppolino
Major General William James Crews
Dr Kylie Cripps
Ms Sarah Davies
Professor Julian Disney
Ms Hazel Douglas
Ms Julie Mary Edwards
Mr Paul Andrew Evans
Mr Ahmed Fahour
Ms Maree Ann Faulkner
Ms Valerie Thelma French, AM
Reverend Keith Vincent Garner
Ms Kerry Graham
Ms Sara Haghdoosti
Professor Ann Harding
Ms Lisa Harvey
Ms Lin Hatfield Dodds
Ms Katrine Ann Hildyard
Mr Mark Hubbard
Ms Joan Anne Hughes
Ms Lyndsey Kate Jackson
Mr Kon Karapanagiotidis
Ms Corinne Kemp
Ms Joan Kirner
Revd Dr Catherine Laufer
Ms Catherine Jean Leane
Dr Marie Leech
Associate Professor Michael Herbert Levy
Mr David Manne
Ms Nickky McColl Jones
Ms Cathryn McConaghy
Mr Alex James McDonald
Ms Jayne Meyer Tucker
Mr Tony Nicholson
Mr Michael O'Neill
Mr Daniel Petre AO
Ms Sandra Joy Pitcher
Mr James Allan Pitts
Professor Barbara Ann Pocock
Mr Francis Gerard Quinlan
Ms Zoe Scott Rathus
Ms Elizabeth Jean Rayner
Father Christopher Riley
Associate Professor Alison Ritter
Ms Anne Miriam Robinson
Dr Wendell John Rosevear
Ms Roslyn Sackley
Professor Ann Sanson
Reverend Graham Sawyer
Professor Peter Shergold
Mr Iqbal Singh
Associate Professor Michelle Slatter
Dr Judith Marion Slocombe
Dr Kevin John Smith
Mr Xian-Zhi Soon
Professor Daniela Anna Stehlik
Ms Tirrania Suhood
Ms Kathleen Swinbourne
Mr Quang Ba Thich
Mr David George Thompson
Adjunct Professor Clyde Spence Thomson
Dr Adam Matthew Tominson
Ms Jessica Catherine Wellard
Mrs Julie Margot White
Ms Linda White
Ms Indigo Willing
Archbishop Philip Edward Wilson
Ms Michele Wright
Mr Galarrwuy Yunupingu

The Productivity Agenda (education, skills, training, science and innovation) 
Chair: Mr Warwick Smith

Ms Yasmin Allen
Associate Professor Marian Baird
Dr Subho Bannerjee
Professor Sharon Joy Bell
Ms Jane Bennett
Ms Michelle Bissett
Mr John Braithwaite
Ms Sarina Bratton
Professor Deb Brennan
Ms Jennifer Buckingham
Ms Allison Burgess
Professor Brian Caldwell
Professor Jack Caldwell
Ms Gillian Calvert
Mr Rod Camm
Professor Bruce James Chapman
Mr Phillip Clarke
Professor Mark Considine
Mr Michael Julian Cooney
Dr Rachael Claire Cooper
Mr Alan Cransberg
Dr Terrence Austin Cutler
Ms Deb Daly
Mr Cholmondeley (Chum) Darvall
Ms Gail Davidson
Professor Peter John Dawkins
Ms Leanne De Bortoli
Mr Jihad Dib
Mr Peter Kevin Dorling
Rev Monsignor Tom Doyle
Ms Patricia Faulkner
Ms Marion Fitzpatrick
Mr William James Frewen
Professor Bryan Malcolm Gaensler
Professor Joshua Samuel Gans
Mr Angelo Gavrielatos
Mr Bob Gregory
Dr Nicholas John Gruen
Professor Jeanette Hacket
Ms Sandra Harding
Professor Elizabeth Harman
Dr Ian Harper
Ms Liz Harris
Professor Jeannie Herbert
Ms Bee Ho Teow
Mr William (Sam) Jeffries
Mr Tony Keenan
Prof Dr Marcia Lynne Langton
Mr Jeff Lawrence
Dr Andrew Leigh
Ms Catherine Brighid Livingstone
Mr Ken Loughnan AO
Mr Christopher Jonn Lovell
Ms Lucy Macali
Ms Tanya Major
Professor Geoff Masters
Mr Patrick McClure AO
Professor Barry McGaw
Ms Barbara McPherson
Dr Zoe Morrison
Ms Karen Moses
Ms Julie Moss
Professor Bruce David Muirhead
Mr Peter Noonan
Mr Andrew Norton
Mr Frank Oberklaid
Mr Dave Oliver
Ms Marilynne Paspaley
Ms Rachel Peck
Ms Marie Persson
Mr Anthony Pratt
Professor Janice Reid AM
Dr Chris Sarra
Mr Bill Scales
Ms Sally Margot Sinclair
Mr Steven Michael Skala
Ms Judith Sloan
Mr Keith Spence
Ms Rosa Storelli
Ms Natalie Tabbah
Professor Collette Tayler
Professor Leon van Schaik
Ms Gerri Walker
Mr Peter Francis Waters
Professor Jonathan West
Dr Fiona Quality Wood
Ms Helen Wyatt
Mr Mandawuy Yunupingu

There were three additional late participants for the Productivity Agenda working group who had been granted special entry as winners of competitions and their names did not show in the original lists of participants.
 Mrs Susan Roberts (winner Today Show national competition)
 Mr Ernie Peralta (idea "The Golden Guru")
 Mr Nathan Barns selected by Radio Station 6pr to represent WA.

Towards a Creative Australia 
Chair: Ms Cate Blanchett

Ms Louise Adler
Mr Neil Armfield
Mr Stephen Armstrong
Mr Geoffrey John Atherden
Mr James Baker
Ms Geraldine Barlow
Professor Larissa Behrendt
Ms Mara Blazic
Mr Shaun Michael Brown
Adjunct Professor Michael Bryce
Ms Jennifer Margaret Buckland
Mr Darrell Buckley
Ms Leticia Caceres
Mr Bob Campbell
Ms Karen Casey
Ms Kate Champion
Professor John Coetzee
Mr Robert John Connolly
Ms Alison Croggon
Professor Stuart Cunningham
Mr Andrew Denton
Ms Rachel Dixon
Mr Khoa Do
Ms Phoebe Rebecca Dunn
Ms Jo Dyer
Mr Joel Edgerton
Ms Kristy Edmunds
Mr Wesley Enoch
Mr Saul Eslake
Associate Professor Robyn Ann Ewing
Ms Anna Funder
Mr Richard Gill
Dr Peter Goldsworthy
Mr David Michael Gonski, AC
Mr Michael William Gow
Mr Paul Grabowksi
Ms Corinne Grant
Ms Anna Haebich
Ms Marieke Hardy
Mr Sam Haren
Ms Rachel Healy
Mr Frank Richard Howarth
Mr Scott Hocknull
Ms Catherine Elizabeth Hunt
Mr Hugh Jackman
Mr Nick Jose
Ms Claudia Karvan
Mr Andrew Kay
Ms Ana Kokkinos
Mr Barrie Kosky
Ms Ramona Koval
Ms Sandra Levy
Dr Liza Swee Lyn Lim
Mr Fergus Linehan
Ms Rachael Bronwyn Lucas
Mr Matthew Lutton
Ms Elizabeth Ann Macgregor
Mr Greg Mackie
Ms Anna Malgorzewicz
Mr Nicholas George Grant Marchand
Ms Catherine Martin
Ms Susan Mary Maslin
Mr David Graeme McAllister
Mr Hal McElroy
Mr Marshall McGuire
Dr Julian Meyrick
Ms Shelagh Mgaza
Ms Jan Minchin
Mr Callum Morton
Mr Rhys Muldoon
Mr Enda Murray
Mr Rupert Myer
Ms Rose Myers
Ms Lena Nahlous
Ms Sue Nattrass AO
Ms Margo Neale
Ms Helen O'Neil
Ms Alison Joy Page
Mr Stephen Page
Mr Charles Parkinson
Ms Rachel Perkins
Mr David John Pledger
Mr John Polson
Ms Marion Potts
Dr Ronald Warwick Radford
Professor John Redmond
Mr Ian Robertson
Mr Mark Scott
Ms Margaret Seares
Ms Katrina Sedgewick
Mr Ivan Sen
Mr Brett Sheehey
Mr Adam Simpson
Mr James Strong
Professor David Throsby
Mr Richard Tognetti
Ms Mary Vallentine
Mr Marcus Westbury
Mr Kim Williams
Dr Astrid Elizabeth Grace Wootton

Australia 2020 Summit Youth Delegates 

Eleven young people were also selected by their peers at the 2020 Youth Summit, running from 11 to 13 April 2008, to represent Australian youth at the Australia 2020 Summit:

Mr Michael Loftus – A long-term national health strategy
Ms Angela Ha and Mr Tom O'Connor – Australia’s future security and prosperity in a rapidly changing region and world
Mr Siddhartha Chakrabarti – Future directions for the Australian economy
Ms Naomi Godden – Future directions for rural industries and rural communities
Mr Owen Wareham – Future of Australian governance
Mr Tim Goodwin – Options for the future of Indigenous Australia
Mr Ben Kent – Population, sustainability, climate change and water
Ms Samah Hadid – Strengthening communities, supporting families and social inclusion
Mr Simon Sheikh – The Productivity Agenda (education, skills, training, science and innovation)
Ms Tammy Edwards – Towards a Creative Australia

References

2008 in Australia
Political history of Australia
2008 conferences
Lists of Australian people